Lieutenant General Zameer Uddin Shah, PVSM, SM, VSM  is a retired senior General of the Indian Army. He last served as the Deputy Chief of Army Staff (Personnel & Systems),  Indian Army. After retirement, he served for some time as an administrative member on the bench of the Armed Forces Tribunal. He was the Vice-Chancellor of Aligarh Muslim University.

Early life and education
Zameer Uddin Shah was born on 15 August 1948 in Bahraich district, Uttar Pradesh, India. An alumnus of St Joseph's College, Nainital, he is the brother of noted Indian actor Naseeruddin Shah. General Shah holds a Master of Science degree in Defence Science from the University of Madras and a Master of Philosophy degree from the Devi Ahilya Vishwavidyalaya University, Indore.

Military career
Shah attended the National Defence Academy in Khadakwasla, Pune. He was  commissioned with the 185 Light Regiment (Camel Pack) on 9 June 1968. He is also commanded 170 Medium Regiment (Veer Rajputs). Shah was later the Colonel Commandant of the Regiment of Artillery. He was also the Indian military attaché to Saudi Arabia. He had led the Army during the Gujarat riots of 2002.

Vice-Chancellor of AMU
Lt Gen Zameeruddin Shah was the Vice-Chancellor of Aligarh Muslim University from 2012–17.

Controversies
Gen Shah was quoted by the media as saying that there would be "four times more boys" in Maulana Azad Library if undergraduate girl students were allowed in. He later claimed that his comments were stretched out of the proportion.

Lt. Gen Shah also attributed the backwardness of Muslims to keeping their women "enslaved" and not working during Ramzan.

The HRD Ministry has responded to the Lt. Gen Shah's comment with Minister Smriti Irani saying, "AMU VC's reported remark not only hurts as a woman but also agitates". Irani termed the remark an "insult to daughters". The Ministry also sought a response from the university.

The Allahabad High Court had issued a notice over reports of the university denying a section of students access to its central library calling it a case of gender-based bias, the court also issued a notice to Lt. Gen Shah. The Court directed that adequate measures must be taken so that girls can come to the library.

He stoked another controversy aftermath the Maulana Azad Library issues by banning The Times of India at the university campus which reported about the library issue at the first hand.

Lt. Gen Shah is also embroiled in a controversy on his appointment as Vice-Chancellor. The Supreme Court has issued notice on petition challenging his appointment.

Bibliography

See also
Lieutenant General Syed Ata Hasnain
Lieutenant General Sami Khan
Lieutenant General Jameel Mahmood
Lieutenant General Mohammad Ahmed Zaki

References

External links
Information from the Government of India website 
Article from Times of India 
Article from Indian Daily News and Analysis 
Article about General Z.U.Shah by his younger brother Naseeruddin 

|-

Indian generals
Indian Muslims
Indian people of Pashtun descent
Living people
Zameer Uddin Shah
Vice-Chancellors of the Aligarh Muslim University
1948 births
Recipients of the Param Vishisht Seva Medal
Recipients of the Sena Medal
Recipients of the Vishisht Seva Medal
Indian military attachés